Martha Modena Vertreace-Doody (born Nov. 24, 1945) is an American poet, and author of short stories and articles on literature and teaching. She is currently Distinguished Professor of English and Poet-in-Residence at Kennedy-King College in Chicago.

Vertreace-Doody was born in Washington, D.C. She earned degrees in English from District of Columbia’s Teachers College (BA in 1967) and Roosevelt University (MA, 1972), an MS in Religious Studies from Mundelein College in 1982, and an MFA from Vermont College (1996). She has twice been a Fellow at the Hawthornden International Writers’ Retreat in Scotland.

Her work focuses on American experiences, as a black woman in the Chicago region, as a participant in American history, and as a community activist. She has been involved in Chicago’s Catholic and African American communities, serving as a time as an editor of Community Magazine at Friendship House in Chicago, and publishing poetry in the National Catholic Reporter.

Her literary career aligned with a growing movement emerging after the 1950s of academic institutions in Chicago to foster poets.
Vertreace-Doody was the featured Illinois poet in the winter 1988 issue of Spoon River Quarterly.
She was a featured poet in Maverick Magazine in 1999. Her poems have appeared in anthologies including Illinois Voices: An Anthology of Twentieth-Century Poetry (University of Illinois Press), Poets of the New Century (David R. Godine Publisher), and Manthology: Poems on the Male Experience (University of Iowa Press) and The Incredible Sestina Anthology (Write Bloody Publishing). Her most recent work, In This Glad Hour, was based on a study of diaries and letters from 1824-1848, to create a collection of poems that chronicles and gives voice to the life of Elizabeth Duncan, the wife of Joseph Duncan, the sixth governor of Illinois.

Awards
 In 1993 she received the Significant Illinois Poet Award, presented by Gwendolyn Brooks.
 Her 1995 collection, Light Caught Bending, published won a Scottish Arts Council Grant, the first time the award was given to a writer who is not British.
 She has been the winner of four Illinois Arts Council awards (in 1987 for the poem "Trade Secret", in 1989 for the poem "My Uncle Speaks of Bees")
 In 1993 she won a National Endowment for the Arts Fellowship in Creative Writing.
 Her 2004 book Glacier Fire won the Word Press Poetry Prize
 In 2005 she received the Kathy Osterman Award as Outstanding Educational Employee by Mayor Richard M. Daley.

Selected works

Collections of Poems 
 2014. In This Glad Hour. 2014. Purple Flag
 2004. Glacier Fire. Word Press.
 1999. Dragon Lady, Tsukimi. Riverstone Press. 
 1998. Smokeless Flame. Frith Press.
 1996. Maafa: When Night Becomes a Lion. Ion Books. 
 1995. Cinnabar. Flume Press.
 1995. Light Caught Bending. Diehard Publishers. 
 1994. Oracle Bones. White Eagle Press.
 1991. Under a Cat’s-Eye Moon. Clockwatch Review Press.
 1986. Second House from the Corner. Kennedy-King College Press.

Stories for Children
 1993. Martha M. Vertreace and Sandra Speidel. Kelly in the Mirror.

Essays
 2003. Martha Modena Vertreace-Doody. "In Hyde Park: Momentary Stay Against Confusion," In the Middle of the Middle West: Literary Nonfiction from the Heartland, Becky Bradway (ed). Indiana University Press.
 1993. Martha M. Vertreace. "StreetWise Writers: Use of StreetWise in Creative Writing Classes," ERIC.
 1989. Martha M. Vertreace. "Secrets left to tell: creativity and continuity in the mother-daughter dyad." Mother Puzzles: Daughters and Mothers in Contemporary American Literature Mickey Pearlman (ed). New York: Greenwood Press.
 1989. Martha M. Vertreace. "Toni Cade Bambara: The Dance of Character and Community," American Women Writing Fiction: Memory, Identity, Family, Space, Mickey Pearlman (ed). University of Kentucky Press.

External links
 Audio files of her work as Featured Illinois Poet: http://www.bradley.edu/sites/poet/featured/
 Video (2011) of her reading the poem "Under the Full Crust Moon": https://www.youtube.com/watch?v=-RM-BCsGbjQ
 Link to episode of NPR's Quiddity: http://quidditylit.com/?p=1871

References

21st-century American poets
1945 births
20th-century American poets
African-American poets
American Roman Catholic poets
American women poets
Catholic poets
Writers from Chicago
20th-century American women writers
Vermont College of Fine Arts alumni
Living people
21st-century American women writers
20th-century African-American women writers
20th-century African-American writers
21st-century African-American women writers
21st-century African-American writers